Orestes Valley is a small ice-free valley at the north side of Mount Orestes in the Olympus Range, Victoria Land in East Antarctica. It was named in 1964 by American geologist Parker E. Calkin for its association with Mount Orestes.

Valleys of Victoria Land
McMurdo Dry Valleys